This is a list of the notation used in Alfred North Whitehead and Bertrand Russell's Principia Mathematica (1910–1913).

The second (but not the first) edition of Volume I has a list of notation used at the end.

Glossary

This is a glossary of some of the technical terms in Principia Mathematica that are no longer widely used or whose meaning has changed.

Symbols introduced in Principia Mathematica, Volume I

Symbols introduced in Principia Mathematica, Volume II

Symbols introduced in Principia Mathematica, Volume III

See also
Glossary of set theory

Notes

References
 Whitehead, Alfred North, and Bertrand Russell. Principia Mathematica, 3 vols, Cambridge University Press, 1910, 1912, and 1913. Second edition, 1925 (Vol. 1), 1927 (Vols. 2, 3).

External links 
 List of notation in Principia Mathematica at the end of Volume I 
 "The Notation in Principia Mathematica" by Bernard Linsky.
 Principia Mathematica online (University of Michigan Historical Math Collection):
 Volume I
 Volume II
 Volume III
 Proposition ✸54.43 in a more modern notation (Metamath)

Large-scale mathematical formalization projects
Analytic philosophy literature
Mathematical logic
Mathematics books
Logic books
Mathematics literature
Books by Bertrand Russell
Works by Alfred North Whitehead
Mathematical notation
Logic symbols
Principia Mathematica
Wikipedia glossaries using description lists